Lancelotto Malocello (Latin: Lanzarotus Marocelus; ; fl. 1312) was a Genoese navigator, who gave his name to the island of Lanzarote, one of the Canary Islands. Lancelotto is the Italian form of the proper name Lancelot.

History
Lancelotto Malocello was born in Varazze (Republic of Genoa), now Province of Savona, in 1270. The navigator is credited with the rediscovery of the Canary Islands in 1312; the island first appeared on a European map of Angelino Dulcert (the Dulcert Atlas) in 1339 under the name "Ínsula de Lançarote Mallucellus" (island of Lancelotto Malocello), later shortened to "Lanzarote". The island's native name was Tyterogaka.

Malocello may have voyaged in search of the brothers Vandino and Ugolino Vivaldi, who had sailed to the Canary Islands in 1291 on their way to India, and whose fate was unknown.  Malocello arrived on the island in 1312, and remained there for almost two decades until he was expelled by a Guanche revolt.  Information about this revolt is scanty, but his stay on the island is supported by various sources, including the chronicles of the Norman conquest of the island under Jean de Béthencourt almost a century later, which state that the fortress constructed by Malocello could still be found on the island.  Malocello's fortress was situated above Teguise.

At the time of Malocello's arrival, a king named Zonzamas ruled the island. Ico, his daughter, and Guanarame, her consort, succeeded Zonzamas.  Their son Guadarfia was the ruler who would greet the expedition of Jean de Béthencourt in 1402.

Legacy
To celebrate the seventh centenary of the discovery of Lanzarote, in the Canary Islands by the Italian navigator Lanzarotto Malocello, which took place in 1312, promoters formed two committees, one in Spain and one in Italy.  The committees sponsored various events in Rome, Varazze, Brussels, Strasbourg, Madrid and Lanzarote, among other cities.

In 2012 Lanzarote commemorated the 700th anniversary of Malocello's rediscovery of the Canary Islands with a number of conferences. One of the speakers was Alfonso Licata, who focused on the historical context of the voyage.

A delegation of the mayor and 162 residents of Varazze (Malocello's hometown) visited Lanzarote.  They arrived aboard the cruise ship Costa Deliziosa, which followed a route between Italy and Lanzarote emulating the path Malocello likely followed to the Canaries.

To commemorate the event has been coined a commemorative medal made official by the School of the Art  Medal and Mint State and published a book by Alfonso Licata "Lanzarotto Malocello, from Italy to the Canary" by the CISM- Ministry of Defence. The Council of Roma Capitale, in 2012, at the request of the organizing committee, on the occasion of the seventh centenary, has dedicated a public green park furnished to the illustrious navigator in the Ostiense district. Similarly, the city of Savona, in turn, again at the request of the Organising Committee in 2013 dedicated to  Malocello a green Area equipped with playground in the Port area.

An Italian destroyer, the Lanzerotto Malocello, was named after him.  It saw action during the Spanish Civil War and World War II.

See also
Canary Islands

Sources

References

External links 
Documentos y bibliografía histórica sobre Canarias 

13th-century births
14th-century deaths
14th-century explorers
14th-century Genoese people
Italian explorers
Italian navigators
History of the Canary Islands
Lanzarote